Sadeq Saba (born in Rasht, Iran) is an Iranian journalist and political theorist, and former head of BBC Persian Television. Saba studied Law and Politics at the University of Tehran before obtaining a Ph.D. degree at the London School of Economics. Saba joined BBC Persian Service as a producer in 1990. He was the BBC Iranian affairs analyst for over a decade prior to joining the BBC Persian television and before that a practicing lawyer. He travels to Iran regularly and has covered three presidential elections and other major events in the country. Most recently, Sadeq traveled to Iran to present the television series A Taste of Iran.

He has previously appeared on The Daily Politics.

In February 2009, Saba presented a four-part series on the BBC World Service called A Taste of Iran.

References

BBC newsreaders and journalists
BBC World Service presenters
Iranian journalists
Iranian emigrants to the United Kingdom
Alumni of the London School of Economics
People from Rasht
Living people
Year of birth missing (living people)